Kudiyabroso is a rural locality (a selo) in Akhvakhsky District, Republic of Dagestan, Russia. The population was 2,233 as of 2010.

Geography 
Kudiyabroso is located on the Izanitlar River, 11 km southeast of Karata (the district's administrative centre) by road. Izano is the nearest rural locality.

References 

Rural localities in Akhvakhsky District